Daniel John Ferguson Paton (3 December 1871 – 9 August 1957) was a Scottish footballer who played in the Football League for Aston Villa. He made one appearance for Scotland in 1896 while playing club football for St Bernard's in Edinburgh, where he also won the Scottish Cup a year earlier. He began and ended his career at Vale of Leven and also featured for Clyde.

Some publications assert that Robert Paton, also an international from the same neighbourhood, was his brother, but this is incorrect; however his actual elder brothers were footballers: Alex had several seasons with Bolton Wanderers, and Jim also played for Vale of Leven and Aston Villa.

Season 1889-1890 
Daniel Paton made his League and Club debut for Aston Villa on 17 March 1890 when Villa made the trip to the Victoria Ground, Stoke-on-Trent. Paton played at Centre-Forward. The match ended 1-1.

Season 1890-1891
Paton made two appearances for Villa in 1890. Both at Centre-Forward and he scored in the first match. The Lancashire Evening Post of 11 October 1890 reported on the Aston Villa vs Everton match, played at Wellington Road on that day. The match ended 2-2 and Paton kicked off and nearly scored. The Post article read as follows, "There were fully 12,000 spectators present, and a great enthusiasm was evinced. Paton re-appeared for the Villa, as did Albert Brown. Everton played their full strength team. At four o’clock Paton kicked off uphill for the Villa, and, with a grand, pretty run, nearly scored, the final shot shaving the post. Paton did score one of Villa' goals. Paton' final appearance for the Villa first team was on 18 October 1890. Villa travelled to  County Ground, Derby and Villa lost a very high scoring match 5-4.

Season 1898-1899
Daniel Paton was re-signed by Villa in 1898 but was never selected to play.

Statistics
Source:

References

1871 births
1957 deaths
Scottish footballers
Aston Villa F.C. players
English Football League players
Scottish Football League players
Scotland international footballers
Vale of Leven F.C. players
St Bernard's F.C. players
Clyde F.C. players
People from Bonhill
Association football forwards
Footballers from West Dunbartonshire